In enzymology, a 3-hydroxybutyryl-CoA epimerase is an enzyme that catalyzes the chemical reaction

(S)-3-hydroxybutanoyl-CoA  (R)-3-hydroxybutanoyl-CoA

Hence, this enzyme has one substrate, (S)-3-hydroxybutanoyl-CoA, and one product, (R)-3-hydroxybutanoyl-CoA.

This enzyme belongs to the family of isomerases, specifically those racemases and epimerases acting on hydroxy acids and derivatives.  The systematic name of this enzyme class is 3-hydroxybutanoyl-CoA 3-epimerase. Other names in common use include 3-hydroxybutyryl coenzyme A epimerase, and 3-hydroxyacyl-CoA epimerase.  This enzyme participates in fatty acid metabolism and butanoate metabolism.

Structural studies

References

 
 

EC 5.1.2
Enzymes of known structure